Mahendra Kumar Roy is a Nepalese politician. He is the current elected central working committee member of Nepali Congress.

He was elected to the Pratinidhi Sabha in the 1999 election on behalf of the Nepali Congress.

Electoral history

2017 legislative elections

2008 Constituent Assembly election

1999 legislative elections

References

Living people
Nepali Congress politicians from Madhesh Province
Place of birth missing (living people)
Nepal MPs 1999–2002
Nepal MPs 2022–present
1959 births